The 1959 Cork Senior Hurling Championship was the 71st staging of the Cork Senior Hurling Championship since its establishment by the Cork County Board in 1887. The draw for the opening round fixtures took place at the Cork Convention on 25 January 1959. The championship began on 5 April 1959 and ended on 25 October 1959.

Glen Rovers entered the championship as the defending champions.

The final was played on 25 October 1959 at the Athletic Grounds in Cork, between Glen Rovers and Blackrock, in what was their first meeting in the final in two years. Glen Rovers won the match by 3-11 to 3-05 to claim their 17th championship title overall and a second title in succession

Christy Ring from the Glen Rovers club was the championship's top scorer with 6–12.

Results

First round

Quarter-finals

Semi-finals

Final

Championship statistics

Top scorers

Top score overall

References

Cork Senior Hurling Championship
Cork Senior Hurling Championship